Cochlicopa lubrica is a species of small air-breathing land snail, a terrestrial pulmonate gastropod mollusk in the family Cochlicopidae.

Description
The 5–7.5 x 2.4–2.9 mm shell has  4–5 moderately convex whorls. The aperture inside is  slightly thickened. There are no apertural teeth and there is no umbilicus. Shell colour is horny yellowish to reddish brown. The animal is greyish or blackish, with dark tentacles .

This species can be hard to differentiate from the similar species Cochlicopa lubricella.

Taxonomy
Cochlicopa repentina Hudec, 1960 has been evaluated as a form of Cochlicopa lubrica in 1994.

Distribution
This species occurs in countries and islands including:
 Czech Republic
 Netherlands
 Poland
 Slovakia
 Ukraine
 Spain
 Great Britain
 Ireland
 Hungary

References

Other sources
 Barker, G. M. (1999). Naturalised terrestrial Stylommatophora (Mollusca: Gastropoda). Fauna of New Zealand 38: 1-254
 Spencer, H.G., Marshall, B.A. & Willan, R.C. (2009). Checklist of New Zealand living Mollusca. pp 196–219 in Gordon, D.P. (ed.) New Zealand inventory of biodiversity. Volume one. Kingdom Animalia: Radiata, Lophotrochozoa, Deuterostomia. Canterbury University Press, Christchurch
 Herbert, D.G. (2010). The introduced terrestrial Mollusca of South Africa. SANBI Biodiversity Series, 15: vi + 108 pp. Pretoria
 Kerney, M.P., Cameron, R.A.D. & Jungbluth, J-H. (1983). Die Landschnecken Nord- und Mitteleuropas. Ein Bestimmungsbuch für Biologen und Naturfreunde, 384 pp., 24 plates. [Summer or later]. Hamburg / Berlin (Paul Parey).
 Sysoev, A. V. & Schileyko, A. A. (2009). Land snails and slugs of Russia and adjacent countries. Sofia/Moskva (Pensoft). 312 pp., 142 plates
 Yen, T.-C. (1939). Die chinesischen Land- und Süßwasser-Gastropoden des Natur-Museums Senckenberg. Abhandlungen der Senckenbergischen Naturforschenden Gesellschaft, 444: 1-233, pl. 1-16. Frankfurt am Main.
 Minato, H. (1988). A systematic and bibliographic list of the Japanese land snails. H. Minato, Shirahama, 294 pp., 7 pls
 National Institute of Biological Resources. (2019). National Species list of Korea. II. Vertebrates, Invertebrates, Protozoans. Designzip. 908 pp.

External links

Cochlicopa lubrica at Animalbase taxonomy,short description, distribution, biology,status (threats), images
 "Cionella lubrica (Müller, 1774): Glossy Pillar". Terrestrial Gastropods of the Columbia Basin, British Columbia]
 "Cionella lubrica (Muller), Glossy pillar snail – Biodiversity of Great Smoky Mountains National Park"
 Müller, O. F. (1774). Vermium terrestrium et fluviatilium, seu animalium infusorium, Helminthicorum, et testaceorum, non marinorum, succincta historia. vol 2: I-XXXVI, 1-214, 10 unnumbered pages. Havniae et Lipsiae, apud Heineck et Faber, ex officina Molleriana
 Westerlund C.A. (1877). Sibiriens Land- och Sötvatten-Mollusker. I. Kongliga Svenska Vetenskaps-Akademiens Handlingar. 14(12): 1-111
 Stimpson, W. (1851). Shells of New England; a revision of the synonymy of the testaceous mollusks of New England, with notes on their structure and their geographical and bathymetrical distribution, with figures of new species. Phillips, Sampson and Company, Boston. 1-58, plates 1-2
 Schileyko, A. A. & Rymzhanov, T. S. (2013). Fauna of land mollusks (Gastropoda, Pulmonata Terrestria) of Kazakhstan and adjacent territories. Moscow-Almaty: KMK Scientific Press. 389 pp

Cochlicopidae
Molluscs of Europe
Gastropods described in 1774
Taxa named by Otto Friedrich Müller